Gunn Kansara (born 22 December ?) is an Indian actress based in Mumbai. She had acted in numerous television shows and  she played the role of Chandani Verma in Nadaniyaan.

Television

References

External links
 

Actresses from Mumbai
Female models from Mumbai
Indian television actresses
21st-century Indian actresses
Living people
Actresses in Hindi television
1982 births